Alex Heffes (born 2 September 1971) is a British film composer. His film scores include those for the BAFTA-winning Touching the Void, and Oscar-winning movies One Day in September, The Last King of Scotland, and Inside Job. Heffes was nominated for the Golden Globe Award for Best Original Score for his work on Mandela: Long Walk to Freedom.

Early life and career

Heffes was born in Beaconsfield, Buckinghamshire, and learned the piano from an early age. He graduated from Oxford University with first class honours and started his professional life playing keyboards and writing and arranging for commercials and TV (his band is featured playing in jazz club scenes in the film Circus). This led to him becoming assistant to composer Simon Boswell with whom he scored over 20 movies including A Midsummer Night’s Dream and Cousin Bette. He also collaborated on Elton John's score to Women Talking Dirty and worked with members of Blur.

Film scoring

In 1999, after a chance meeting with Kevin Macdonald he wrote the score to the Oscar winning documentary One Day in September. This led to a long collaboration with Macdonald, on films such as Touching the Void, State of Play and The Last King of Scotland. During the production of Last King of Scotland he travelled to Uganda to produce the songs and score in the movie. He has worked with many notable directors including Stephen Frears (The Program), Mira Nair (Queen of Katwe), Justin Chadwick (The First Grader, Mandela: Long Walk to Freedom), Peter Webber (Emperor) and Catherine Hardwick (Red Riding Hood). He contributed additional arrangements to Tim Burton's Sweeney Todd.

In 2011 he released his first solo album, Face to Face. The album was created by improvising on location in a series of one on one collaborations with artists such as Regina Spektor, Ryuichi Sakamoto and Tunde Jegede. The tracks with Matthew Barley were recorded in the Turbine Hall of the Tate Modern in London.

He has been nominated for a Golden Globe, a BAFTA and won an Ivor Novello Award in 2012 for The First Grader.

He always conducts his own orchestral scores and frequently plays piano on his scores.

Works

Film score

Television

Awards and nominations
Nominated: 2007 BAFTA TV Awards Best Original Television Music - Tsunami: The Aftermath
Nominated: 2007 European Film Award, European Composer - The Last King of Scotland
Won: 2009 ASCAP Award for Top Box Office Films - State of Play
Won: 2011 World Soundtrack Awards, Discovery of the Year - The First Grader, The Rite
Nominated: 2012 Black Reel Awards, Best Original Score - The First Grader
Nominated: 2012 Image Awards, Outstanding Soundtrack Album - The First Grader
Won: 2012 Ivor Novello Awards, Best Original Film Score - The First Grader
Nominated: 2013 Golden Globe Awards Best Original Score for a Motion Picture - Mandela: Long Walk to Freedom
Nominated: 2016 Online Film & Television Association Awards, Best Music in a Non-Series - Roots (2016)
Won: 2016 Hollywood Music In Media Awards, Original Score for a TV Show/Mini Series - Roots (2016)

References

External links
 
 Official Website

1971 births
Living people
British film score composers
British male film score composers
People from Beaconsfield
Ivor Novello Award winners